Carrió is one of 12 parishes (administrative divisions) in Carreño, a municipality within the province and autonomous community of Asturias, in northern Spain.

The postal code is 33492.

Villages
 Aboño
 L'altu Aboño
 Bandín
 El Cantu San Xuan
 Les Cruciaes
 La Cuesta Carrió
 La Llamera
 Otero
 El Palacio
 La Peruyera
 El Regueru
 La Sabarriona

References

Parishes in Carreño